Vascular and Endovascular Surgery is a monthly peer-reviewed medical journal that covers the field of vascular surgery. It was established in 1967 and is published by SAGE Publications. The editor-in-chief is Thomas Maldonado.

Abstracting and indexing 
The journal is abstracted and indexed in Scopus, and the Science Citation Index Expanded. According to the Journal Citation Reports, its 2012 impact factor is 0.859, ranking it 65 out of 65 journals in the category "Peripheral Vascular Disease" and 176 out of 203 journals in the category "Surgery".

References

External links 
 

SAGE Publishing academic journals
English-language journals
Monthly journals
Publications established in 1967
Surgery journals